South Korea has submitted films to compete for the Academy Award for Best International Feature Film since 1962. The award is handed out annually by the United States Academy of Motion Picture Arts and Sciences to a feature-length motion picture produced outside the United States that contains primarily non-English dialogue. The Korean nominee is chosen annually by a special committee assembled by the Korean Film Council.

South Korea has submitted thirty-three films for consideration. In 2019, Burning became the first Korean film to make it to the final nine-film shortlist of the 91st Academy Awards for Best Foreign Language Film. In 2020, Parasite became the first South Korean film to earn a nomination for Best International Feature Film; it also was the first Korean film nominated for Best Picture, Best Director, and Best Original Screenplay. At the 92nd Academy Awards, Parasite won all four awards (out of six nominations), becoming the first non-English language film to win Best Picture. North Korea has never sought to participate in the competition, and has never sent any films.

South Korea's first three submissions were directed by Shin Sang-ok, as was their 1990 submission. Shin later became internationally famous after he was held hostage in North Korea between 1978 and 1986, and forced to make movies for Kim Jong-Il. Lee Chang-dong has had three films selected to represent South Korea. Six other directors, Lee Doo-yong, Kim Ki-duk, Kim Tae-kyun, Lee Joon-ik, Jang Hoon and Bong Joon-ho, have had two of their films selected.

Submissions
Every year, each country is invited by the Academy of Motion Picture Arts and Sciences to submit its best film for the Academy Award for Best Foreign Language Film. The Foreign  Language Film Award Committee oversees the process and reviews all the submitted films. Following this, they vote via secret ballot to determine the five nominees for the award. Below is a list of the films that have been submitted by South Korea for review by the Academy for the award since its conception. All submissions were filmed in the Korean language.

See also
List of Academy Award winners and nominees for Best Foreign Language Film
List of Academy Award-winning foreign language films
Cinema of Korea
In the Absence

Notes

References

External links
 The Official Academy Awards Database
 The Motion Picture Credits Database
 IMDb Academy Awards Page

Korea, South
Academy Award for Best Foreign Language Film